Count Henry III of Nassau-Dillenburg-Dietz (12 January 1483, Siegen – 14 September 1538, Breda), Lord (from 1530 Baron) of Breda, Lord of the Lek, of Dietz, etc. was a count of the House of Nassau.

He was the son of Count John V of Nassau-Dillenburg and Elisabeth of Hesse-Marburg. His younger brother was William I, Count of Nassau-Siegen (the father of William the Silent).

Career
In 1499 Henry's uncle, count Engelbert II, invited Henry to the Burgundian Netherlands as his heir. He travelled with Philip the Handsome to Castile in 1501-1503. Upon the death of his uncle in 1504 Henry inherited the Nassau possessions in the Netherlands, including the wealthy lordship of Breda in the duchy of Brabant. The next year he was chosen a knight of the Golden Fleece. He again travelled to Spain in 1505-1506. He became a close confidant of the young Charles V as well as his Chamberlain (1510), becoming his Upper Chamberlain upon the death of William of Croÿ-Chièvres in 1521. The good relations between Charles and Henry is evident in the fact that Charles did not name a new Upper Chamberlain after Henry's death. Henry was named Grand Huntsman of Brabant, a position at court he held until the end of his life.

In 1519 he was part of the delegation that had Charles chosen king of the Romans. He was also prominently present at Charles' coronation to Emperor in Bologna in 1530. He was a member of the Privy Council of Charles since 1515 and of the Privy Council of Archduchess Margaret of Austria between 1525-1526. He temporarily served as Stadtholder of the conquered parts of Guelders and was Stadtholder of Holland and Zeeland between 1515 and 1521. Henry was again in Spain between 1522 and 1530 (accompanying Charles) and in 1533-1534 (with his wife and son).

Military commander
Henry served as an important military commander in the Netherlands, defending Brabant from Guelders in 1508. He was Captain General in the war with Guelders between 1511 and 1513, and fought with Maximilian of Austria against France until 1514, participating in the battle of Guinegate (1513). He again commanded the armies against Guelders and France between 1516 and 1521, defeating the Black Band, which was in the employ of Charles of Guelders, in 1518 and defeating Robert van der Marck, Lord of Sedan in 1521. He also repelled Francis I of France, who invaded Hainaut that same year. Subsequently, Henry conquered Tournai.

Beliefs
Although Henry, who attended the Diet of Augsburg in 1530, was at first not averse to Martin Luther and his teachings, he later followed Charles' example and remained a staunch Catholic. He didn't approve of the choice of his brother William, who did become a Lutheran, but remained supportive of him throughout his life. He was very impressed with the Renaissance and especially its arts, examples of which he encountered on his journeys to Spain and Italy. For example, he commissioned Italian architect Tomasso Vincidor da Bologna to completely rebuild his castle at Breda in a renaissance style in 1536, one of the first of such buildings north of the Alps. However, his interests seem to have been superficial. Desiderius Erasmus only considered him a "platonic friend of science".

Family life and death

Henry married three times:
On 3 August 1503 Henry III married firstly Françoise Louise of Savoy (° bef. 1486 - † 17 September 1511). They had no children.
In May 1515 Henry III married secondly Claudia of Châlon (° 1498 – † 31 May 1521). They had one son, René of Châlon (° 5 February 1519 - † 18 July 1544), who became prince of Orange in 1530 on the death of Claudia's brother Philibert.
On 26 June 1524 Henry III married thirdly Mencia de Mendoza y Fonseca (° 30 November 1508 – † 4 January 1554). They had one son, born in March 1527, who lived only a few hours.

Henry had no further legitimate children, although he is known to have had some illegitimate offspring, amongst them Alexis of Nassau-Corroy and Isabelle of Nassau, both legitimised after the death of their father, and both had an impressive descendance. One of his descendants is Philippe François de Berghes, 1st Prince of Grimberghen.

His third marriage to Mencia de Mendoza y Fonseca was mainly encouraged by Charles V, as part of his plan to make the nobility of Spain and the Low Countries mix. Henry was however never really liked by the Spaniards, who regarded him as a loud and barbarian German parvenu. Upon his death in 1538 he was succeeded by his only son, but René was himself slain in battle only a few years later in 1544.

References

Sources

Further reading
 Hans Cools, Mannen met Macht (Walburg Pers, Zutphen, 2001)
 H.P.H. Jansen, Nassau en Oranje in de Nederlandse geschiedenis (Sijthoff, Alphen a/d Rijn, 1979)
 Grew, Marion Ethel, "The House of Orange" ( Methuen & Co. Ltd., 36 Essex Street, Strand, London W.C.2, 1947)
 Rowen, Herbert H.,  "The princes of Orange: the stadholders in the Dutch Republic", (Cambridge University Press, 1988).
 Motley, John Lothrop "The Rise of the Dutch Republic" vol.1. (Harper Brothers Publishers, 1855)

1483 births
1538 deaths
Military personnel from Siegen
Dutch stadtholders
Henry III of Nassau-Breda
Knights of the Golden Fleece
Lords of Breda
Counts of Nassau
Military leaders of the Italian Wars
Hunters
Dutch generals